Maurice Rabinowicz (born 23 August 1947) is a Belgian film director and writer.

He studied theatre at the Institut national supérieur des arts du spectacle (INSAS) in Brussels, graduating in 1970.  His style of film-making has been described as Brechtian. His 1978 film One Page of Love was entered into the 28th Berlin International Film Festival.

Filmography 
 Nègre (1968)
 Canal K (1970) – with Boris Lehman
 Le Nosferat ou les eaux glacées de calcul égoïste (1975)
 Des anges et des démons (1978)
 Une page d'amour (One Page of Love) (1978) – with Sami Frey and Geraldine Chaplin
 Une femme en fuite (1982) – with Marie Dubois

References

External links

1947 births
Living people
Belgian film directors